Torker was a brand of bicycles and unicycles owned by Seattle Bike Supply, headquartered in Kent, Washington.

History
The Torker name was created by Johnson Engineering in Fullerton, CA in 1977 for a BMX bike frame. The first Haro bikes were made by Torker. In 1982, Torker let go Bob Haro when he introduced his own line of BMX racing pants. In 1984, the Torker Bicycle Company went bankrupt, and Seattle Bike Supply purchased the name. BMX bikes with the Torker name were made from the late 1970s into the 2000s. Torker's product line expanded to include beach cruisers, tandem bikes and even unicycles. Reader's Digest nominated Torker unicycles as "America's 100 Best" for 2006, and Torker was awarded BEST OF 2006 in the December issue of Seattle Magazine. Seattle Bike Supply was acquired by Accell in 2006.

BMX team
Torker sponsored a BMX racing team that included such riders as:
Kevin McNeal
Leo Green
Mike Miranda
Richie Anderson
Tommy Brackens
Clint Miller
Eddy King
Matt Hadan
Steve Veltman
Mike King
Cheri Elliott
Kelly McDougal
Jason Jenson

Products
The Torker line currently includes bicycles, unicycles, strollers, and trailers.

Bicycles
The bicycles include adult (men's and women's), children, tandem, and cruisers.

Unicycles
The unicycles include ones with 16", 20", 24", 26", and 29" wheels, a 5' giraffe, and a 20" trail.
Beginner Unicycles, CX Unistar: 16' 20" and 24"
Intermediate Unicycles, LX Unistar: 20", 24", 26"
Trials Unicycles, DX Unistar: 20" and 24"
Giraffe Unicycle, TX Unistar: 20".

References

External links
 Torker website
Seattle Bike Supply website

Cycle manufacturers of the United States
BMX
Companies based in Kent, Washington